Kopstal is a commune and a small town in central Luxembourg. The towns of Kopstal and Bridel belong to this commune. Kopstal is a small town, with a population of 644 , located in a valley between forested hills situated beneath Bridel.

It is in the countryside and at ten minutes distance driving from the capital. School children are able to attend the schools in the city and young people can enjoy Luxemburg City's night life. There are many paths through the forests next to Kopstal.

Kopstal was formed on 1 July 1853, when it was detached from the communes of Kehlen (in Capellen canton) and Steinsel (in Luxembourg canton).  The law forming Kopstal was passed on the 22 February 1853.

Population

References

External links
 

 
Communes in Capellen (canton)
Towns in Luxembourg